Voivozi may refer to several villages in Romania:

 Voivozi, a village in Popeşti Commune, Bihor County
 Voivozi, a village in Şimian Commune, Bihor County